Gridinskaya is a rural locality (a village) in Boretskoye Rural Settlement of Vinogradovsky District, Arkhangelsk Oblast, Russia. The population was 174 as of 2010. There is 1 street.

Geography 
Gridinskaya is located on the Tyoda River, 83 km southeast of Bereznik (the district's administrative centre) by road. Zadorikha is the nearest rural locality.

References 

Rural localities in Vinogradovsky District